Robecco d'Oglio is a comune (municipality) in the Province of Cremona in the Italian region Lombardy, located about  southeast of Milan and about  north of Cremona.

Transportation 
Robecco is served together with Pontevico by a railway station (named Robecco-Pontevico) on the Brescia–Cremona line.

References

Cities and towns in Lombardy